INVU may refer to:

INVU (album), by Taeyeon, 2022
"INVU" (song), the title track from the album
I.N.V.U. (manhwa)